Sally F. Carson is a Canadian marine biologist and the director of the New Zealand Marine Studies Centre at the University of Otago.

Carson completed a bachelor of science degree at Mount Allison University in 1984, and a master's in science at the University of Alberta. Much of her postgraduate research was completed at Bamfield Marine Sciences Centre, Vancouver Island.

In 2017, Carson designed a national citizen science project to involve members of the public in the long term monitoring of the New Zealand seashore. She has written a range of educational resources for primary and intermediate school students, as well as a series of identification guides to the plants and animals which inhabit New Zealand's seashores.

Publications 

New Zealand Seashore Secrets (with Denis Page; Hodder Moa Beckett, 1994)
Southern seas: discovering marine life at 46 [degrees] south (with Keith Probert and John Jillet; University of Otago Press, 2005)
Southern NZ, sandy & muddy shore guide (NZ Marine Studies Centre, 2014)
Collins Field Guide to the New Zealand Seashore (with Rod Morris; Collins, 2017)

References

Living people
Year of birth missing (living people)
Mount Allison University alumni
University of Alberta alumni
Academic staff of the University of Otago